Macrocephalitidae is an extinct family of marine invertebrate animals belonging to the superfamily Stephanoceratoidea, order Ammonitida.

Etymology
The Macrocephalitidae is one of the 11 families listed in the Treatise, 1957 Part L in the superfamily Stephanoceratoidea.

According to Donovan et al. (1981) the superfamily Stephanoceratoidea should contain only five families and the Macrocephalitidae of the Treatise are reduced to subfamilies within the Sphaeroceratidae, Macrocephalitinae and Mayaitinae, but still in the Stephanoceratoidea.

Genus
 Macrocephalites †
 Pleurocephalites †

References

 Arkell at al, 1957. Mesozoic Ammononidea, Treatise on Invertebrate Paleontology, Part L, Mollusca 4. Geol. Soc. of America and Univ. Kansas press; R.C. Moore, Ed. p. L287 
Donovan, Callomon and Howarth, 1981. Classification of the Jurassic Ammonitina; Systematics Association. PDF
Biolib

Stephanoceratoidea
Ammonitida families